The highest-selling albums in Australia are ranked in the Australian Recording Industry Association albums chart, also known as the ARIA Charts, published by the Australian Recording Industry Association (ARIA). The data are compiled from a sample that includes music stores, music departments at electronics and department stores, and Internet sales (in other words, both digital as well as CD sales). ARIA also issues a weekly singles chart. In addition, data from these weekly charts are used to compile an end of year albums and singles chart.

Alternative rock band Kings of Leon's Only by the Night had the longest non-consecutive run among the releases that reached peak position in 2009; it spent 14 non-consecutive weeks atop the chart, beginning in the 2008 chart year and continuing until 13 April, with a break between 16 February and 23 March. The Essential Michael Jackson by Michael Jackson, and I Dreamed a Dream by Susan Boyle had the longest consecutive run atop the chart, spending 7 weeks each at number one. In total, there were 19 number one albums during 2009.

During 2009, six acts received their first Australian number one album, these being Lily Allen, Natalie Bassingthwaighte, Paramore, Ronan Keating, Short Stack and Susan Boyle.

I Dreamed a Dream, which debuted at number one on 30 November, was 2009's highest selling album on the ARIA end-of-year albums chart, ahead of Pink's album Funhouse.

Chart history

See also
2009 in music
List of number-one singles of 2009 (Australia)

References

2009
Australia Albums
2009 in Australian music